Yamanashi Gakuin University (Japanese: 山梨学院大学, Yamanashi gakuin daigaku) (YGU) is a university in Kōfu, Yamanashi Prefecture, Japan. Yamanashi Gakuin was founded in 1946. Today, it is a comprehensive educational institution that includes a kindergarten, elementary school, junior high and high school, junior college, university and graduate school. (YGU) sits at the core of the whole institution, and aims to contribute to society by nurturing in students profound knowledge and creativity, a globalized perspective and deep understanding of and appreciation for Japanese culture.

Faculties and Departments 
 International College of Liberal Arts (iCLA) / Department of International Liberal Arts
 Faculty of Law / Department of Law
 Faculty of Law / Department of Politics & Public Administration
 Faculty of Business Administration / Department of Business Administration
 Faculty of Management Information / Department of Management Information
 Faculty of Health and Nutrition / Department of Nutrition
 Faculty of Sport Science / Department of Sport Science
 Graduate School of Social Science Africa Asia

Areas of interest 
Yamanashi Gakuin University is well known for a long-distance intercollegiate relay race and has produced 70 Olympians in its nearly 70-year history. Ten athletes participated in the London 2012 Summer Olympics–one of whom earned a medal in three swimming events, the first-ever Japanese female swimmer to do so. In 2004, YGU received a special prize from the Japan Olympic Committee and in 2010 and 2013 a special award from Japan's Ministry of Education, Culture, Sports, Science and Technology in recognition of their excellence in world sports. In 2020 Tokyo Olympic, 17 athletes participated in the event and two of them won gold medals.

Notable alumni 
 Naito Ehara (Class of 2015) - Olympic swimmer (Rio de Janeiro bronze medal)
 Kanae Yamabe (Class of 2012) - Olympic judoist (Rio de Janeiro bronze medal)
 Lien Chen-li (Class of 2011) - Olympic judoist
 Yuka Kato (Class of 2009) - Olympic Swimmer (London Bronze medal)
 Mekubo Mogusu (Class of 2009) - long-distance Runner
 Kazuyoshi Saito - musician
 Karolina Styczyńska - professional shogi player
 Satomi Suzuki (Class of 2013) - Olympic Swimmer (London silver and bronze medal)
 Takuto Otoguro - The youngest Japanese ever freestyle wrestling senior world champion

External links 

 University Website
 International College of Liberal Arts Website
 YGU Program Profiled by The Japan Times (2015)

Private universities and colleges in Japan
Universities and colleges in Yamanashi Prefecture
Kōfu, Yamanashi